The LCDR Brigand class was a pair of steam locomotives of the 0-4-2 wheel arrangement supplied to the London, Chatham and Dover Railway (LCDR). They were designed by Patrick Stirling for the Glasgow and South Western Railway (GSWR), which ordered twenty in 1860 from Sharp, Stewart & Co. (order no. E371). At this time, the LCDR needed more locomotives but had little money available, so their locomotive superintendent, William Martley, visited various manufacturers to find out what was available quickly and cheaply. He arranged for two of the locomotives ordered by the GSWR to be delivered instead to the LCDR – they arrived in August 1861, two more being ordered from Sharp, Stewart for the GSWR as replacements (order no. E416).

Like other LCDR locomotives delivered prior to 1874, the locomotives originally had no numbers, being distinguished by name. In November 1875, William Kirtley (who had replaced Martley following the latter's death in 1874) allotted the class letter O. The locomotives were then given the numbers 1 and 2. In 1884, no. 2 was rebuilt with a new boiler; no. 1 was similarly treated in 1890. They passed to the South Eastern and Chatham Railway (SECR) at the start of 1899, and their numbers were increased by 459 to avoid duplication with former South Eastern Railway locomotives. Both were withdrawn from service in May 1903.

Before joining the LCDR, Martley had worked for the Great Western Railway (GWR); and the names for these two locomotives were taken from the first two of the GWR Bogie Class.

Notes

References

Brigand
0-4-2 locomotives
Railway locomotives introduced in 1861
Sharp Stewart locomotives
Scrapped locomotives
Standard gauge steam locomotives of Great Britain